Syed Tariq Fatemi (born 9 July 1944), is a Pakistani diplomat who is currently serving as the Special Assistant on Foreign Affairs to the Prime Minister Shahbaz Sharif. He previously served as Pakistan Ambassador to the United States and to the European Union.

Biography
Born in Dhaka, British India, Fatemi went on to serve as a career foreign service officer and has held diplomatic missions throughout his career. In addition, he also provided his foreign policy expertise to represent Pakistan's case at the International Atomic Energy Agency (IAEA). Aside from foreign service, he has briefly taught courses on International relations at the Foreign Service Academy and as well as courses on Security studies at the National Defence University and the Quaid-i-Azam University. A key member of the Pakistan Muslim League (N), he is the author of the book, "The Future of Pakistan", and has repeatedly appeared in news media to comment on foreign affairs of the country. He is an expert on Russian studies and is fluent in Russian language.

Controversy surrounded him during Nawaz Sharif's tenure.

Career 
His career as a Pakistani diplomat is enriched with assignments in Pakistan Missions abroad, including New York, Moscow (twice), Beijing and Washington (twice). He served as Additional Foreign Secretary (Americas and Europe Divisions) and worked in the Prime Minister’s Office, in charge of Foreign Affairs, Defense and Defense Production.

From 1982 to 1986, he served as the delegate to the UN General Assembly Sessions and attended several Non-Aligned and OIC Conferences, while being the member of the UN-sponsored Geneva negotiations on Afghanistan.

In 1999, Fatemi was promoted to the rank of a Federal Secretary—the highest rank in the country’s civil service.

He also served as the High Commissioner (Ambassador) of Pakistan to Zimbabwe and later served as the Ambassador of Pakistan to the US, Jordan, Belgium, Luxembourg and then to European Union (Brussels) and retired in 2004.

After his retirement, he joined the Pakistan Muslim League (N) and assisted the party on various foreign policy matters.

In April 2017, the Prime Minister's Office issued directives to remove Fatemi from his post as Special Assistant to the Prime Minister on Foreign Affairs, for his alleged role in Dawn Leaks. Earlier, an inquiry committee had held Fatemi responsible for the Dawn Leaks. The allegation was rejected by Fatemi in a farewell letter.

On 20 April 2022, Prime Minister Shehbaz Sharif appointed Syed Tariq Fatemi as his special assistant on foreign affairs.

References

1944 births
Bengali educators
People from Dhaka
Pakistani people of Bengali descent
University of the Punjab alumni
University of Dhaka alumni
Moscow State University alumni
Conservatism in Pakistan
Academic staff of the National Defence University, Pakistan
Academic staff of Quaid-i-Azam University
Pakistani political scientists
Foreign Secretaries of Pakistan
Ambassadors of Pakistan to the United States
Russian studies scholars
Pakistan Muslim League (N) politicians
Ambassadors of Pakistan to the Democratic Republic of the Congo
Living people
Russian–Urdu translators